Mission San Luis may refer to:
 Mission San Luis de Apalachee, in Florida
 Mission San Luis Obispo de Tolosa, in San Luis Obispo, California
 Mission San Luis Rey de Francia, in Oceanside, California